Vivodina is a village in Croatia, Karlovac County. It is first mentioned on September 22, 1321. The village is well known for a long winery tradition and that both parents of NBA Hall of Famer George Mikan descends from Vivodina near Ozalj.
Here was born , writer and the first Kajkavian translator of the Holy Gospels.

References

Populated places in Karlovac County